2007 Sumatra earthquakes may refer to:

 March 2007 Sumatra earthquakes
 September 2007 Sumatra earthquakes

See also
List of earthquakes in Indonesia